{{DISPLAYTITLE:C21H21NO6}}
The molecular formula C21H21NO6 (molar mass: 383.39 g/mol, exact mass: 383.1369 u) may refer to:

 Hydrastine
 Rhoeadine (rheadine)

Molecular formulas